Stanford Field was an outdoor college football stadium on the west coast of the United States, located on the campus of Stanford University in Stanford, California. At the current site of the Taube Tennis Center, it was the home field for Stanford football and rugby.

Opened  in 1905, its inaugural event was the Big Game between Stanford and California on November 11, with Stanford winning 12–5. Sixteen years later in November 1921, the team moved to the new 60,000-seat Stanford Stadium.

References

Sports venues in the San Francisco Bay Area
Defunct college football venues
Stanford Cardinal football venues
American football venues in California
Sports venues completed in 1905